The 1921–22 Torquay United F.C. season was Torquay United's first season in competitive football and their first season in the Western League.  The season runs from 1 July 1921 to 30 June 1922.

Overview
When Devon's two most successful football clubs Plymouth Argyle and Exeter City became founder members of the Football League Third Division in 1920, questions were asked as to whether Devon's third largest town, Torquay, could support a Football League team of its own.  The seaside resort's two foremost sides were Torquay Town and Babbacombe and, while they had both enjoyed success in the Plymouth & District League, it was felt that Torquay's best chance of creating a team strong enough for the Football League would be for the two fierce rivals to merge.  Despite many years of friction between the sides, it was finally decided that the 1920–21 football season would be the last for both Torquay Town and Babbacombe and that a new professional football club would be formed.

The new team was to be called Torquay United, which was a name that had previously been used from 1899 up until 1910 before the original United merged with Ellacombe to form Torquay Town. Crad Evans, Torquay Town's star striker, was installed as player-manager and the new team adopted a black and white strip which soon earned them the nickname of 'the Magpies'.  Although Torquay United were initially denied entry into the Southern League, they were accepted into the Western League in time for the 1921–22 season.

Despite an encouraging first game of the season, a 1–0 victory over Weymouth, Torquay's form soon dipped and they would not win another League game until the New Year.  However, a run of five wins out of six at the end of the season led United to a respectable mid-table finish in a very competitive league.  Torquay also enjoyed an extended run in the FA Cup, playing a total of eight fixtures (nine including the 75th minute abandonment of the first qualifying round fixture against Spencer Moulton).  United made it as far as the fourth qualifying round before being knocked out by Boscombe.  The newly professional Torquay United also made their last appearance in the Devon Senior Cup.  It was a tournament the club had won under the name of Torquay Town in 1911 and the re-christened United repeated the feat by beating Oreston Rovers 1–0 in the final at Home Park.

At the end of the season, Torquay United again applied to join the Southern League and, on this occasion, were successful in their bid.

Competitions

Western League

Standings

Matches

FA Cup

Devon Senior Cup

Notes
. Match originally played 8 Oct 1921 but was abandoned after 75 minutes due to fog. Torquay United were leading 2-0 at the time.

References

External links

Torquay United
Torquay United F.C. seasons